is a former Japanese football player.

Playing career
Matsumoto was born in Gunma Prefecture on December 9, 1977. After graduating from high school, he joined J1 League club Gamba Osaka in 1996. Although he debuted in 1997, he could not play many matches until 1999. In 2000, he moved to J2 League club Omiya Ardija. Although he could not play many matches initially, his opportunity to play increased and he became a regular player in 2002. However his opportunities decreased and he was hardly included in any team for matches in 2004. His club was promoted to J1 from 2005, but he retired end of 2004 season.

Club statistics

References

External links

1977 births
Living people
Association football people from Gunma Prefecture
Japanese footballers
J1 League players
J2 League players
Gamba Osaka players
Omiya Ardija players
Association football defenders